is a private university in Kurashiki, Okayama, Japan, established in 1995. Currently part of the Kake Gakuen

External links
  

Educational institutions established in 1995
Private universities and colleges in Japan
Universities and colleges in Okayama Prefecture
1995 establishments in Japan